Hernan Espindola (born 19 October 1994) is an Argentinian born professional footballer who plays as a winger for St. Albans Saints in the NPL Victoria.

He played youth football with A-League clubs Melbourne Victory and Melbourne City. In the 2015–16 season he signed a short-term senior contract with Melbourne City.

On 5 February 2016, Espindola joined Hume City.

References

External links
 

1994 births
Living people
Association football midfielders
Australian soccer players
Melbourne Victory FC players
Melbourne City FC players
Hume City FC players
National Premier Leagues players
A-League Men players